Trichaea flammeolalis is a moth in the family Crambidae. It is found in Puerto Rico.

References

Moths described in 1890
Spilomelinae
Moths of the Caribbean